Quila may refer to:
Chusquea quila, a species of bamboo
Quila, Jalisco